A sea serpent or sea dragon is a type of dragon sea monster described in various mythologies, most notably Mesopotamian (Tiamat), Judaeo-Christian (Leviathan), Greek (Cetus, Echidna, Hydra, Scylla), and Norse (Jörmungandr).

Mythology

Mediterranean and Western Asia

The  mytheme, the chief god in the role of the hero slaying a sea serpent, is widespread both in the ancient Near East and in Indo-European mythology, 
e.g. Lotan and Hadad, Leviathan and Yahweh, Tiamat and Marduk (see also Labbu, Bašmu, Mušḫuššu), Illuyanka and Tarhunt, Yammu and Baal in the Baal Cycle etc. The Hebrew Bible also has less mythological descriptions of large sea creatures as part of creation under God's command, such as the Tanninim mentioned in Book of Genesis 1:21 and the "great serpent" of Amos 9:3. In the Aeneid, a pair of sea serpents killed Laocoön and his sons when Laocoön argued against bringing the Trojan Horse into Troy.

In antiquity and in the Bible, dragons were envisioned as huge serpentine monsters, with the image of a dragon with two or four legs and wings developing during the Middle Ages. Stories depicting sea-dwelling serpents may include the Babylonian myths of Tiamat, the myths of the Hydra, Scylla, Cetus, and Echidna in Greek mythology, and Christianity's Leviathan.

Germanic Scandinavia
In Nordic mythology, Jörmungandr (or Midgarðsormr) was a sea serpent or worm so long that it encircled the entire world, Midgard. Sea serpents also appear frequently in later Scandinavian folklore, particularly in that of Norway, such as an account that in 1028 AD, Saint Olaf killed a sea serpent in Valldal in Norway, throwing its body onto the mountain Syltefjellet. Marks on the mountain are associated with the legend.

Natural history 
An apparent eye-witness account is found is given by Aristotle in his work Historia Animalium on natural history. Strabo makes reference to an eyewitness account of a dead sea creature sighted by Poseidonius on the coast of the northern Levant. He reports the following: "As for the plains, the first, beginning at the sea, is called Macras, or Macra-Plain. Here, as reported by Poseidonius, was seen the fallen dragon, the corpse of which was about a plethrum [] in length, and so bulky that horsemen standing by it on either side could not see one another, and its jaws were large enough to admit a man on horseback, and each flake of its horny scales exceeded an oblong shield in length." The creature was seen sometime between 130 and 51 BC.

Norway, 16th century 
Swedish ecclesiastic and writer Olaus Magnus included illustrations of sea serpents and other various  marine monsters on his illustrated map, the Carta marina. In his 1555 work History of the Northern Peoples, Olaus gives the following description of a Norwegian sea serpent:

On bright summer nights this serpent leaves the caves to eat calves, lambs and pigs, or it fares out to the sea and feeds on sea nettles, crabs and similar marine animals. It has ell-long hair hanging from its neck, sharp black scales and flaming red eyes. It attacks vessels, grabs and swallows people, as it lifts itself up like a column from the water.}}

Norwegian Bishop Erik Pontoppidan (1698–1764) did not disbelieve the existence of sea serpents themselves, but doubted they would prey on ships and feed on humans, being more cautious-minded in that respect than Archibishop Olaus (of Upsala). Nevertheless, a number of reports were made by sailors at the time that sea serpents would destroy ships by wrapping the ship in coils of their body and pulling it underwater. Sailors threatened by a sea serpent were said to have thrown large objects such as paddles or shovels overboard in the path of the serpent, hoping that the serpent would take the object and leave without destroying the ship.

 Greenland in 1734 

Rev. Hans Egede,  a Dano-Norwegian clergyman who was an early explorer and surveyor of Greenland, gave an 18th-century description of a sea serpent witnessed by his party. In his journal he wrote:

Egede also wrote on the same sea-monster sighting in his book, noting that the beast was spotted at the 64th degree of latitude, and was as thick or "bulky as the Ship, and three or four times as long". Egede himself did not supply a sketch in this otherwise well-illustrated book, but the missionary named Bing who was his comrade drew a sketch, which is reproduced in Henry Lee's work.

Bing further described this creature as having reddish eyes, almost burning with fire. This convinced Bishop Pontoppidan that this was different from the type of sea serpent seen by others. From Bing's drawing, Pontoppidan estimated the creature to be considerably shorter than the length of a cable rope, or 100 fathoms (200 metres) attested by multiple witnesses, and the pair of fins which were attached "below the waist" in Pontoppidan's view, was another unusual feature.

Lee proposed a rational explanation that this sea-serpent was a misapprehended sighting of what was actually the exposed head and one tentacle of a great squid (Cf. figure above left). 

 New York exhibition in 1845 
In 1845, a 35 meter long skeleton claimed as belonging to an extinct sea serpent was put on a show in the New York City by Albert C. Koch. The claim was debunked by Prof. Jeffries Wyman, an anatomist who went to see the skeleton for himself. Wyman declared that the skull of the animal had to be mammalian in origin, and that the skeleton was composed of bones of several different animals, including an extinct species of whale.

 Portuguese waters, 1848 

The vessel sighted what they named as an enormous serpent between the Cape of Good Hope and St Helena. Captain McQuahoe also said that "[The creature] passed rapidly, but so close under our lee quarter, that had it been a man of my acquaintance I should have easily have recognized his features with the naked eye." According to seven members of the crew, it remained in view for around twenty minutes. Another officer wrote that the creature was more of a lizard than a serpent. Evolutionary biologist Gary J. Galbreath contends that what the crew of Daedalus saw was a sei whale.

(I note such a physeter It can grow to 20-30 meters long!) It lasted for about 15 minutes the deadly struggle, the sea was just foaming and crashing waves around us, finally the back of the whale stood out Out of the water, he sank head first into the deep where the snake must have killed him. A cold shiver ran through us a cet at the sight of his final struggle; so writhing poor in the monster's double ring, like a little bird between the claws of a falcon. View of the two rings, the snake. It could have been 160-170 feet long and 7-8 feet thick."Gallery

In media
 C. S. Lewis's The Chronicles of Narnia features a sea serpent as one of many obstacles in The Voyage of the Dawn Treader'', along with the 1989 TV serial and the 2010 film based on it.

See also
 Bakunawa
 Chinese dragon
 Giant oarfish
 Gyarados
 Kraken
 Lindworm
 Nāga
 Pyrosome
 Selma
 Stronsay Beast
 Ogopogo

Explanatory notes

References

Bibliography

 

 

 

(Further reading)

External links

 Video of the oarfish, a creature that possibly inspired the sea serpent mythology.
 https://emergencemagazine.org/essay/great-sea-serpent/
 https://www.gutenberg.org/files/36677/36677-h/36677-h.htm

 
Legendary serpents
Dragons
Greek legendary creatures
Sea monsters
Tiamat